The state hearse is a vehicle of the Royal Mews used for funerals of the British royal family. Thought to be based on a Jaguar XF or XJ model, it was designed by the Royal Household and Jaguar Land Rover with the input of and approval from Elizabeth II and converted by UK-based coachbuilders Wilcox Limousines. It was first used on 13 September 2022 to transport the Queen's coffin from RAF Northolt to London ahead of her lying-in-state.

Design 
The state hearse was designed by Jaguar Land Rover in collaboration with the Royal Household. Queen Elizabeth II had long favoured Land Rovers as her vehicle of choice. The hearse is thought to be based on a Jaguar XF or XJ saloon design. Its conversion from the standard model was made by Wilcox Limousines.

The hearse has large side and back windows and a glass roof to maximise the coffin's visibility to onlookers. It also features three internal spotlights along one side of the roof to illuminate the coffin, which is on a raised platform. The design of the car is unique. The roof pillars are thinner than in a standard model and the roof is higher.  

The hearse has royal claret coloured paint, which matches other vehicles operated by the Royal Mews. It also sports the royal cypher and a silver-plated bronze mascot depicting Saint George slaying the dragon. Jaguar's "grinner" badge of a jaguar's face is on the front grill and their "leaper" badge of a jumping animal on the rear panel. The Queen approved the final plans for the design of the hearse.

Use 
The state hearse was first used on 13 September 2022 to transport the coffin of Elizabeth II from RAF Northolt to Buckingham Palace. It was then used  on 19 September 2022 to transport the coffin from London's Wellington Arch to St George's Chapel, Windsor Castle for her committal service.

Predecessors 
Previous royal hearses have included a Jaguar XJ used for the funeral of Queen Elizabeth, the Queen Mother and a custom built open top Land Rover Defender for the funeral of Prince Philip.

References 

Hearses
Road transport of heads of state
Royal vehicles
Jaguar Land Rover
State funerals in the United Kingdom